The 1975 New York Mets season was the 14th regular season for the Mets, who played their home games at Shea Stadium. Initially led by manager Yogi Berra followed by Roy McMillan, the team had an 82–80 record and finished in third place in the National League's Eastern Division.

Offseason 
 October 22, 1974: Duffy Dyer was traded by the Mets to the Pittsburgh Pirates for Gene Clines.
 December 3, 1974: Tug McGraw, Don Hahn, and Dave Schneck were traded by the Mets to the Philadelphia Phillies for Del Unser, Mac Scarce and John Stearns.
 January 9, 1975: Greg Harris was drafted by the Mets in the 4th round of the 1975 Major League Baseball draft (Secondary Phase), but did not sign.

Regular season

Season summary 
After the Mets' lackluster 1974 season, changes were made to improve the team. On February 28, the Mets scored a coup. For cash estimated at around $100,000, they acquired the San Francisco Giants' explosive home run hitter, Dave Kingman. A moody but undeniable talent, Kingman had batted just .223 for San Francisco in 1974, striking out every third at-bat, but many of his 18 home runs had traveled breathtaking distances. Kingman, the Mets hoped, would provide the home run power the club lacked, as well as generate some excitement.

The Mets were indeed stronger in 1975. Their .256 batting average was the highest in club history, and Kingman did supply some wallop with a then team-record 36 home runs, while Rusty Staub's 105 RBIs made him the first Met to drive in 100. As before, the club's greatest strength lay in its pitching, topped by Tom Seaver's 22–9 record, good enough for a third Cy Young Award. Jerry Koosman was 14–13 and Jon Matlack 16–12, but beyond that no pitcher won more than seven. At season's end, they concluded with an 82–80 record and a tie for third.

Firings and tragedies 
The Mets' marginal 82–80 record also resulted in the dismissal of manager Yogi Berra on August 6. His replacement for the rest of the season was coach Roy McMillan. Also gone, a week earlier, was Cleon Jones, released outright.

As the season rolled to an end, there was a quick succession of news stories impinging on the Mets. On September 29, Casey Stengel died of cancer in California at the age of 85. A few days later, on October 4, the club's principal owner, Mrs. Joan Payson, died at the age of 72.

In between these two passings, on October 3 the club announced the hiring of their fifth full-time manager. The new man was Joe Frazier, former major league infielder and manager of the Tidewater Tides in 1975. Frazier was the first Mets skipper to not have played or managed for a New York team prior to managing the Mets, having been promoted from within the organization.  Frazier had led the Tides, the Mets' top farm club, to a first-place finish in the International League, earning him the Sporting News award for Minor League Manager of the Year.

Season standings

Record vs. opponents

Notable transactions 
 April 4, 1975: Joe Nolan was traded by the Mets to the Atlanta Braves for Leo Foster.
 April 12, 1975: Jesús Alou was signed as a free agent by the Mets.
 April 25, 1975: Bill Laxton was signed as a free agent by the Mets.

Draft picks 
 June 3, 1975: Butch Benton was drafted by the Mets in the 1st round (6th pick) of the 1975 Major League Baseball draft.

Roster

Player stats

Batting

Starters by position 
Note: Pos = Position; G = Games played; AB = At bats; H = Hits; Avg. = Batting average; HR = Home runs; RBI = Runs batted in

Other batters 
Note: G = Games played; AB = At bats; H = Hits; Avg. = Batting average; HR = Home runs; RBI = Runs batted in

Pitching

Starting pitchers 
Note: G = Games pitched; IP = Innings pitched; W = Wins; L = Losses; ERA = Earned run average; SO = Strikeouts

Other pitchers 
Note: G = Games pitched; IP = Innings pitched; W = Wins; L = Losses; ERA = Earned run average; SO = Strikeouts

Relief pitchers 
Note: G = Games pitched; W = Wins; L = Losses; SV = Saves; ERA = Earned run average; SO = Strikeouts

Awards and honors 
 Dave Kingman – Player of the Month, July 1975
All-Star Game

Farm system 

LEAGUE CHAMPIONS: Tidewater

Notes

References 

1975 New York Mets at Baseball Reference
1975 New York Mets at Baseball Almanac

New York Mets seasons
New York Mets season
1975 in sports in New York City
1970s in Queens